The following are islanders from the Cook Islands:

Entertainers and musicians
 Will Crummer, musician
 Sonny Terei, musician
 Sam V, singer, songwriter
 James Tito, actor, musician
 Stan Walker, musician and singer

Politicians
 Inatio Akaruru, Cook Islands politician. Former  Cabinet Minister and Deputy Prime Minister
 Albert Henry, former Premier of the Cook Islands
 Geoffrey Henry, Cook Islands politician
 Robert Woonton, former Prime Minister of the Cook Islands

Other
 Jacqueline Evans, environmentalist
Vereara Maeva-Taripo, textile artist, political activist, and composer

List
Lists of people by nationality
Lists of Oceanian people